Jonathan Atwood Campbell (born May 13, 1947) is an American herpetologist.
He is currently professor of biology at University of Texas at Arlington. He was a distinguished professor and chair of the Department of Biology, University of Texas at Arlington, Arlington, Texas.

Campbell earned his Bachelor of Science in biology at the University of Texas at Arlington, and he earned his PhD degree in systematics and ecology in 1982 at University of Kansas.

Honors and awards 
 June 2014 - Distinguished Honoree
 March 2014 - Distinguished Alumnus Award
 August 2012 - Fitch Award for Excellence in Herpetology
 June 2008 - W. Frank Blair Eminent Naturalist Award
 June 2003 - Texas Distinguished Scientist
 May 2000 - Nominee, Piper Professor Award
 February 2000 - Research Associate
 January 2000 - Scientific Achievement Award 
 June 1999 - Distinguished Herpetologist of the Herpetologists’ League 
 May 1999 - Academy of Distinguished Teachers
 May 1998 - Distinguished Record of Research Award
 May 1990 - Excellence in Research Award
 May 1990 - Chancellor's Council Excellence in Teaching Award

Taxa

Named after him
Taxa named after him include: 
Bothrocophias campbelli (Freire-Lascano, 1991)
Abronia campbelli E.D. Brodie Jr. & Savage, 1993
Bothrops jonathani Harvey, 1994 
Incilius campbelli (Mendelson, 1994) 
Craugastor myllomyllon (Savage, 2000)
Craugastor campbelli (E.N. Smith, 2005)
Anolis campbelli (G. Köhler & E.N. Smith, 2008)
Crotalus campbelli Bryson, Linkem, Dorcas, Lathrop, Jones, Alvarado-Díaz, Grünwald & Murphy, 2014

Described by him 

Taxa he described include:
 Abronia anzuetoi Campbell & Frost, 1993
 Abronia frosti Campbell, Sasa, Acevedo & Mendelson, 1998
 Abronia gaiophantasma Campbell & Frost, 1993
 Abronia leurolepis Campbell & Frost, 1993
 Abronia meledona Campbell & Brodie, 1999
 Abronia mitchelli Campbell, 1982
 Abronia ornelasi Campbell, 1984
 Abronia ramirezi Campbell, 1994
 Abronia smithi Campbell & Frost, 1993
 Adelphicos daryi Campbell & Ford, 1982
 Adelphicos ibarrorum Campbell & Brodie, 1988
 Amietophrynus Frost, Grant, Faivovich, Bain, Haas, Haddad, de Sá, Channing, Wilkinson, Donnellan, Raxworthy, Campbell, Blotto, Moler, Drewes, Nussbaum, Lynch, Green & Wheeler, 2006
 Anolis naufragus (Campbell, Hillis & Lamar, 1989)
 Bokermannohyla Faivovich, Haddad, Garcia, Frost, Campbell & Wheeler, 2005
 Bolitoglossa centenorumCampbell, Smith, Streicher, Acevedo & Brodie, 2010
 Bolitoglossa daryorum Campbell, Smith, Streicher, Acevedo & Brodie, 2010
 Bolitoglossa eremia Campbell, Smith, Streicher, Acevedo & Brodie, 2010
 Bolitoglossa huehuetenanguensis Campbell, Smith, Streicher, Acevedo & Brodie, 2010
 Bolitoglossa kaqchikelorum Campbell, Smith, Streicher, Acevedo & Brodie, 2010
 Bolitoglossa la Campbell, Smith, Streicher, Acevedo & Brodie, 2010
 Bolitoglossa ninadormida Campbell, Smith, Streicher, Acevedo & Brodie, 2010
 Bolitoglossa nussbaumi Campbell, Smith, Streicher, Acevedo & Brodie, 2010
 Bolitoglossa nympha Campbell, Smith, Streicher, Acevedo & Brodie, 2010
 Bolitoglossa pacaya Campbell, Smith, Streicher, Acevedo & Brodie, 2010
 Bolitoglossa psephena Campbell, Smith, Streicher, Acevedo & Brodie, 2010
 Bolitoglossa suchitanensis Campbell, Smith, Streicher, Acevedo & Brodie, 2010
 Bolitoglossa tzultacaj Campbell, Smith, Streicher, Acevedo & Brodie, 2010
 Bolitoglossa xibalba Campbell, Smith, Streicher, Acevedo & Brodie, 2010
 Bothriechis thalassinus Campbell & Smith, 2000
 Bothrocophias Gutberlet & Campbell, 2001
 Bothrocophias myersi Gutberlet & Campbell, 2001
 Bromeliohyla Faivovich, Haddad, Garcia, Frost, Campbell & Wheeler, 2005
Cenaspis Campbell, Smith & Hall, 2018
 Cerrophidion Campbell & Lamar, 1992
 Cerrophidion tzotzilorum (Campbell, 1985)
 Chapinophis xanthocheilus Campbell & Smith, 1998
 Charadrahyla Faivovich, Haddad, Garcia, Frost, Campbell & Wheeler, 2005
 Charadrahyla nephila (Mendelson & Campbell, 1999)
 Charadrahyla tecuani Campbell, Blancas-Hernández & Smith, 2009
 Coniophanes alvarezi Campbell, 1989
 Craugastor adamastus (Campbell, 1994)
 Craugastor amniscola (Campbell & Savage, 2000)
 Craugastor aphanus (Campbell, 1994)
 Craugastor catalinae (Campbell & Savage, 2000)
 Craugastor charadra (Campbell & Savage, 2000)
 Craugastor inachus (Campbell & Savage, 2000)
 Craugastor palenque (Campbell & Savage, 2000)
 Craugastor pelorus (Campbell & Savage, 2000)
 Craugastor polymniae (Campbell, Lamar & Hillis, 1989)
 Craugastor psephosypharus (Campbell, Savage & Meyer, 1994)
 Craugastor rhyacobatrachus (Campbell & Savage, 2000)
 Craugastor rivulus (Campbell & Savage, 2000)
 Craugastor rupinius (Campbell & Savage, 2000)
 Craugastor sabrinus (Campbell & Savage, 2000)
 Craugastor trachydermus (Campbell, 1994)
 Crotalus ericsmithi Campbell & Flores-Villela, 2008
 Crotalus tancitarensis Alvarado-díaz & Campbell, 2004
 Cruziohyla Faivovich, Haddad, Garcia, Frost, Campbell & Wheeler, 2005
 Cryptotriton monzoni (Campbell & Smith, 1998)
 Cryptotriton wakei (Campbell & Smith, 1998)
 Dendrotriton chujorum Campbell, Smith, Streicher, Acevedo & Brodie, 2010
 Dendrotriton kekchiorum Campbell, Smith, Streicher, Acevedo & Brodie, 2010
 Diploglossus ingridae Werler & Campbell, 2004
 Diploglossus legnotus Campbell & Camarillo, 1994
 Duellmanohyla Campbell & Smith, 1992
 Duttaphrynus Frost, Grant, Faivovich, Bain, Haas, Haddad, de Sá, Channing, Wilkinson, Donnellan, Raxworthy, Campbell, Blotto, Moler, Drewes, Nussbaum, Lynch, Green & Wheeler, 2006
 Ecnomiohyla Faivovich, Haddad, Garcia, Frost, Campbell & Wheeler, 2005
 Exerodonta abdivita (Campbell & Duellman, 2000)
 Exerodonta chimalapa (Mendelson & Campbell, 1994)
 Exerodonta perkinsi (Campbell & Brodie, 1992)
 Exerodonta xera (Mendelson & Campbell, 1994)
 Feihyla Frost, Grant, Faivovich, Bain, Haas, Haddad, de Sá, Channing, Wilkinson, Donnellan, Raxworthy, Campbell, Blotto, Moler, Drewes, Nussbaum, Lynch, Green & Wheeler, 2006
 Geophis pyburni Campbell & Murphy, 1977
 Ingerophrynus Frost, Grant, Faivovich, Bain, Haas, Haddad, de Sá, Channing, Wilkinson, Donnellan, Raxworthy, Campbell, Blotto, Moler, Drewes, Nussbaum, Lynch, Green & Wheeler, 2006
 Isthmohyla Faivovich, Haddad, Garcia, Frost, Campbell & Wheeler, 2005
 Itapotihyla Faivovich, Haddad, Garcia, Frost, Campbell & Wheeler, 2005
 Litoria michaeltyleri Frost, Grant, Faivovich, Bain, Haas, Haddad, de Sá, Channing, Wilkinson, Donnellan, Raxworthy, Campbell, Blotto, Moler, Drewes, Nussbaum, Lynch, Green & Wheeler, 2006
 Megastomatohyla Faivovich, Haddad, Garcia, Frost, Campbell & Wheeler, 2005
 Micrurus pachecogili Campbell, 2000
 Mixcoatlus Jadin, Smith & Campbell, 2011
 Myersiohyla Faivovich, Haddad, Garcia, Frost, Campbell & Wheeler, 2005
 Nototriton brodiei Campbell & Smith, 1998
 Nototriton stuarti Wake & Campbell, 2000
 Oedipina stenopodia Brodie & Campbell, 1993
 Otophryne pyburni Campbell & Clarke, 1998
 Plectrohyla acanthodes Duellman & Campbell, 1992
 Plectrohyla calthula (Ustach, Mendelson, McDiarmid & Campbell, 2000)
 Plectrohyla cyclada (Campbell & Duellman, 2000)
 Plectrohyla ephemera (Meik, Canseco-Márquez, Smith & Campbell, 2005)
 Plectrohyla miahuatlanensis Meik, Smith, Canseco-Márquez & Campbell, 2006
 Plectrohyla pokomchi Duellman & Campbell, 1984
 Plectrohyla psarosema (Campbell & Duellman, 2000)
 Plectrohyla tecunumani Duellman & Campbell, 1984
 Plectrohyla teuchestes Duellman & Campbell, 1992
 Porthidium hespere (Campbell, 1976)
 Poyntonophrynus Frost, Grant, Faivovich, Bain, Haas, Haddad, de Sá, Channing, Wilkinson, Donnellan, Raxworthy, Campbell, Blotto, Moler, Drewes, Nussbaum, Lynch, Green & Wheeler, 2006
 Pseudepidalea Frost, Grant, Faivovich, Bain, Haas, Haddad, de Sá, Channing, Wilkinson, Donnellan, Raxworthy, Campbell, Blotto, Moler, Drewes, Nussbaum, Lynch, Green & Wheeler, 2006
 Pseudoeurycea aquatica Wake & Campbell, 2001
 Pseudoeurycea orchileucos (Brodie, Mendelson & Campbell, 2002)
 Pseudoeurycea orchimelas (Brodie, Mendelson & Campbell, 2002)
 Ptychohyla acrochorda Campbell & Duellman, 2000
 Ptychohyla dendrophasma (Campbell, Smith & Acevedo, 2000)
 Ptychohyla panchoi Duellman & Campbell, 1982
 Ptychohyla sanctaecrucis Campbell & Smith, 1992
 Ptychohyla zophodes Campbell & Duellman, 2000
 Rhadinella anachoreta (Smith & Campbell, 1994)
Rhadinella xerophila 
 Rhadinophanes monticola Myers & Campbell, 1981
 Tantilla ceboruca Canseco-márquez, Smith, Ponce-Campos, Flores-Villela & Campbell, 2007
 Tantilla impensa Campbell, 1998
 Tantilla sertula Wilson & Campbell, 2000
 Tantilla tecta Campbell & Smith, 1997
 Tantilla vulcani Campbell, 1998
 Tlalocohyla Faivovich, Haddad, Garcia, Frost, Campbell & Wheeler, 2005
 Vandijkophrynus Frost, Grant, Faivovich, Bain, Haas, Haddad, de Sá, Channing, Wilkinson, Donnellan, Raxworthy, Campbell, Blotto, Moler, Drewes, Nussbaum, Lynch, Green & Wheeler, 2006
 Xenosaurus penai Pérez Ramos, De La Riva & Campbell, 2000
 Xenosaurus phalaroanthereon Nieto-Montes De Oca, Campbell & Flores-Villela, 2001

Books
Campbell JA, Lamar WW (1989). The Venomous Reptiles of Latin America. Ithaca, New York: Cornell University Press. xiv + 430 pp., 568 figures, 109 distribution maps, 31 tables. .
Campbell JA, Brodie ED Jr. (editors) (1992). Biology of the Pitvipers. Tyler, Texas: Selva. xi + 567 pp., 200 figs., 100 tables, 17 plates with 122 color illustrations. .
Campbell JA (1998). The Amphibians and Reptiles of Northern Guatemala, Yucatán, and Belize. Norman, Oklahoma: University of Oklahoma Press. 367 pp. .
McDiarmid RW, Campbell JA, Touré TA (1999). Snake Species of the World, A Taxonomic and Geographic Reference. Vol. 1. Washington, District of Columbia: The Herpetologists League. xi + 511 pp.  .
Campbell JA, Lamar WW (2004). The Venomous Reptiles of the Western Hemisphere. (2 volumes). Ithaca, New York: Cornell University Press. xvii + 870 pp., 282 figs., 8 color maps, 113 distribution maps, 1,500 plates, 63 tables. .

References

External links 
 

American herpetologists
American taxonomists
1947 births
Living people
University of Texas at Arlington faculty
University of Texas at Arlington alumni
University of Kansas alumni
20th-century American zoologists
21st-century American zoologists